The 1898–99 season was Newton Heath's seventh season in the Football League and their fifth in the Second Division. They finished fourth in the league, which was not enough to earn promotion back to the First Division. In the FA Cup, the Heathens managed to take Tottenham Hotspur to a replay back at Bank Street after a 1–1 draw at Northumberland Park, before losing 5–3 in the replay.

The club also entered teams in the Lancashire and Manchester Senior Cups in 1898–99, but little progress was made in either competition. The club received a bye to the third round of the Manchester Senior Cup, but lost 4–1 to Bury. It was a similar story in the Lancashire Cup, as they beat Darwen 5–0 in the first round before losing 6–1 to Blackburn Rovers in the second round.

Second Division

FA Cup

References

Manchester United F.C. seasons
Newton Heath